Anna Magdalene Thoresen, née Kragh (3 June 1819 – 28 March 1903) was a Danish-born Norwegian poet, novelist, short story writer and playwright.  She is said to have inspired a number of other writers to model characters after her. Her stepdaughter, Suzannah Ibsen, was married to Henrik Ibsen.

Personal life
She was born Anna Magdalene Kragh in Fredericia, Denmark, the daughter of skipper Thomas Nielsen Kragh and Anna Kristine Pedersen. She gave birth to an illegitimate child, who was put out to nurse. She then moved to Norway in 1842 and became governess for dean Hans Conrad Thoresen (1802–1858) at Herøy in Sunnmøre. He was a widower and had five children, and she married him in 1843. From 1844 they lived in Bergen, where she played a central role in the cultural life. Her stepdaughter, Suzannah Ibsen, was married to Henrik Ibsen. She had four children with Hans Conrad Thoresen. After her husband's death in 1858, she travelled to Copenhagen in 1861, moved to Christiania in 1866, and lived in Copenhagen from 1870. She died in Copenhagen in 1903.

Career
In Bergen the Thoresens' home became a meeting place for writers and actors. In 1850 Ole Bull established a theatre in Bergen, called Det Norske Theater. Thoresen wrote four plays that were staged anonymously at Det Norske Theater. Through the theatre she became acquainted with playwright Henrik Ibsen. She was a friend of Bjørnstjerne Bjørnson, who published her poetry collection Digte af en dame in 1860. Among her novels are Studenten, published in the collection Fortællinger in 1862, Signes Historie from 1864, Min Bedstemoders Fortælling from 1867, and  Solen i Siljedalen from 1868. She published the travel book Billeder fra Vestkysten av Norge in 1872, and another travel book, Billeder fra Midnatsolens Land, in 1882.

Influence
Thoresen's personality became a model for several female characters in Norwegian literature, including Ibsen's "Rebekka West" (from Rosmersholm) and "Ellida Wangel" (from The Lady from the Sea), and Bjørnson's "Maria Stuart" (from his 1864 play), the wild girl "Petra" from Fiskerjenten and "Leonarda" (from his 1879 play).

References

External links
 

Danish women poets
19th-century Norwegian poets
19th-century Danish novelists
Danish women dramatists and playwrights
Norwegian dramatists and playwrights
1819 births
1903 deaths
Norwegian women novelists
Danish women novelists
Norwegian women poets
19th-century Danish poets
19th-century Norwegian novelists
19th-century Danish dramatists and playwrights
19th-century Danish women writers
19th-century Norwegian women writers
People from Fredericia